The Twilight Zone (1985) is the first of three revivals of Rod Serling's acclaimed 1959–64 television series of the same name. It ran for two seasons on CBS before producing a final season for syndication.

The show was narrated by Charles Aidman (1985–1987) and Robin Ward  (1988–1989).

Series overview

Episodes

Season 1 (1985–86)

Season 2 (1986–87)

Season 3 (1988–89)

References

 
Lists of anthology television series episodes
Lists of American science fiction television series episodes